Upeslejas is a village in Stopiņi Parish, Ropaži Municipality in the Vidzeme region of Latvia. It is located near Mazā Jugla river, about 15km from Riga.

References 

Towns and villages in Latvia
Ropaži Municipality
Kreis Riga
Vidzeme